Krebs School is a private school located in Stockholmsgade in Copenhagen, Denmark. It was founded on 15 August 1872 by Conrad Peter Julius Krebs. Several members of the Danish Royal Family have attended the school, along with other members of the Danish upper class and nobility. As of 2023, the school's headmaster is Mikael Fink-Jensen.

History 
The school was established on 15 August 1872 by C.P.J. Krebs, who had been the headmaster of Metropolitanskolen until 1871. Initially, the school was run out of Krebs' own home on Sortedam Dossering. It soon moved to a location on Tordenskjoldsgade in central Copenhagen and then to Nørregade 20. In 1878 the school secured funding to construct its own building at Stockholmsgade 5. It was designed by architect Charles Abrahams. The school officially moved into the building on 17 September 1878. Stockholmsgade 5 contained all of the school's programs until 1959, when it began expanding into other buildings. Today, the school's campus consists of Stockholmsgade 5, 7, and 9, as well as a smaller pavilion.

Notable alumni 
 Crown Prince Frederik
 Prince Joachim
 Prince Nikolai
 Prince Felix

References 

Primary schools in Copenhagen
Private schools in Copenhagen
Educational institutions established in 1872
1872 establishments in Denmark